

The Mandalorian, an American space Western streaming television series set in the Star Wars universe created by Jon Favreau and released on Disney+, features an extensive cast of characters. Since the show's debut on November 12, 2019, only one character has appeared in every episode: the protagonist and title character, a bounty hunter primarily known simply as "The Mandalorian" (Din Djarin). Grogu (The Child) is a young alien of the same species as Star Wars character Yoda and the show's hugely popular breakout character, colloquially known among the fandom as "Baby Yoda". 

Several supporting characters appeared in at least three episodes of the first season of The Mandalorian, credited as co-starring. These include allies of the Mandalorian such as Cara Dune, Greef Karga, IG-11, Kuiil, and The Armorer. The primary villains of the series belong to a remnant of the Galactic Empire, which is led by Moff Gideon and includes such agents as The Client and Dr. Pershing. A handful of guest characters made appearances in single episodes, including villagers from the planet Sorgan in "Chapter 4: Sanctuary", a band of mercenaries in "Chapter 6: The Prisoner", and several minor antagonists.

Cast

Starring

Recurring co-stars
The following cast members have been credited as co-starring in at least two episodes within a season.

Featured co-stars
The following cast members have been credited as co-starring in a single episode within a season in which they play a significant role.

Guest starring

Main characters

Din Djarin / The Mandalorian

The Mandalorian, sometimes abbreviated as Mando, is a sobriquet for Din Djarin, the protagonist of The Mandalorian television series. Introduced as a bounty hunter, he is a member of the Mandalorian culture, as evidenced by his beskar armor and his distinctive helmet, which he never removes in front of anyone. He was a "foundling" who was rescued at a young age by the Mandalorians and adopted into their culture prior to the events of the series, after his parents were murdered by Separatist battle droids during the Clone Wars, which resulted in his intense hatred of droids. In the television series, the Mandalorian encounters a young alien known as "The Child", whom he attempts to protect from a remnant of the now-fallen Galactic Empire.

The Mandalorian is portrayed and voiced by Pedro Pascal, and stunt actors Brendan Wayne and Lateef Crowder perform as body doubles when Pascal is unavailable. Pascal has cited Clint Eastwood as an influence on the character, and many comparisons have been drawn between the Mandalorian and Eastwood's Man with No Name. The Mandalorian creator Jon Favreau suggested Pascal watch Akira Kurosawa's samurai films and Eastwood's Spaghetti Westerns as preparation for the role. The Mandalorian character and Pascal's performance have been well received by audiences and critics.

Grogu

Grogu, also known as "The Child" and colloquially referred to by fans and the media as "Baby Yoda", is a young alien of the same species as popular Star Wars character Yoda. Although 50 years old, he is still an infant by the standards of his species, and although he cannot yet speak, he demonstrates a strong natural ability with The Force. A remnant of the Galactic Empire led by Moff Gideon is seeking the child to extract its blood for Dr. Pershing's secret experiments; the bounty hunter known as "The Mandalorian" is hired to track Grogu down. Instead of turning him over, however, the Mandalorian attempts to protect the child from the Imperials. By the end of the first season, the child is adopted into the Mandalorian culture as a "foundling", and the Mandalorian is tasked with reuniting the child with others of his kind.

The child has been hugely popular with fans and reviewers, becoming the show's breakout character, and the subject of many Internet memes. The character was conceived by Jon Favreau out of a desire to explore the mystery around Yoda and his species, and was developed in early conversations about the series between Favreau and executive producer Dave Filoni. The child is mostly a creation of animatronics and puppetry, although accentuated with computer-generated imagery. He is voiced by sound editor David Acord with the aid of various sound effects. The Guardian called Baby Yoda "2019's biggest new character", and many have described him as a key part in the success of the Disney+ streaming service.

Bo-Katan Kryze

Bo-Katan Kryze is a Mandalorian warrior and the former ruler of Mandalore from House Kryze who appears in "Chapter 11: The Heiress" and "Chapter 16: The Rescue". Bo-Katan is portrayed by Katee Sackhoff, who previously voiced the character in animated form in Star Wars: The Clone Wars and Star Wars Rebels. In the third season, Bo-Katan Kryze is credited as a main cast member, the first character other than the Mandalorian and Grogu to be credited as anything other than co-starring.

In "Chapter 11: The Heiress", Bo-Katan and the Nite Owls rescue The Mandalorian and The Child. She introduces herself, revealing her heritage as a Mandalorian, and that Din Djarin's group are zealots who wish to restore ancient Mandalorian traditions. The Mandalorian leaves rejecting their help. Later Bo-Katan and the Nite Owls again rescue The Mandalorian. In return for information he reluctantly agrees to help them seize a shipment of weapons. During the raid Bo-Katan changes plan, deciding to take the whole ship, not just the weapons. When they capture the bridge, Bo-Katan interrogates the head officer, wanting to know about the Dark Saber. Bo-Katan was impressed by the Mandalorian and invites him to join them, but he must continue his quest, so she tells him to go to the forest planet of Corvus, to find the Jedi Ahsoka Tano. In "Chapter 16" Bo-Katan helps The Mandalorian to rescue The Child from Moff Gideon.

In "Chapter 17" and "Chapter 18" the Mandalorian sets out on a pilgrimage to the mines of Mandalore and needs Bo-Katan's help. At first she refuses, but when the Mandalorian gets into trouble, he sends Grogu to get her help, and she races to Mandalore and saves him. They find the Living Waters and the Mandalorian bathes in the waters, only to fall into it. Bo-Katan saves him again and as they return to Bo-Katan's home, they are attacked by Imperials and her home is destroyed. The Mandalorian takes her to the Mandalorian hideout, where he delivers proof of his pilgrimage and Bo-Katan is also accepted as she too bathed in the Waters.

Recurring characters
Several characters have been featured in more than one episode within a season of The Mandalorian.

Introduced in season one

Greef Karga

Greef Karga is a leader of the Bounty Hunters' Guild, who serves as both an ally and adversary to the Mandalorian at different points in the show's first season. Operating out of the planet Nevarro, Greef gives assignments to bounty hunters and ensures everyone follows the guild's code. Greef provides the assignment that leads the Mandalorian to meet the Child. When the Mandalorian refuses to turn the Child over to the Imperials, Greef leads a group of bounty hunters in an unsuccessful attempt to take the Child from him. Greef later devises a plan to kill the Mandalorian and return the Child to the Imperials, but when the Child saves his life, Greef has a change of heart and helps protect him from the Empire while becoming a better man. In season 2 and onwards, he becomes the Magistrate of Navarro.

Greef Karga is portrayed by Carl Weathers, whom Jon Favreau knew through the Directors Guild of America. Weathers accepted the part under the condition that he could direct future episodes of The Mandalorian in the second season. Greef was originally to appear only in a handful of episodes, but Favreau and the writers liked the character so much that the part was expanded. Weathers performs his own stunts in the role. The character has received generally positive feedback from fans and reviewers.

The Client

The Client is a mysterious and unnamed agent of the Imperial remnant. He hires the Mandalorian, as well as several other bounty hunters, to recover the Child on behalf of his superior, Moff Gideon. The Client does not reveal why he wants the Child, but he orders his colleague, Dr. Pershing, to "extract the necessary material" from him. The Mandalorian delivers the Child to the Client, but later rescues him back. The Client conspires to recapture the Mandalorian and the Child, but after the Mandalorian returns to him, the Client is shot and killed by stormtroopers under Gideon's orders.

The Client is portrayed by German film director Werner Herzog, who was recruited for the part by Jon Favreau. Herzog accepted the role in part to help finance his film Family Romance, LLC (2019). Herzog was not familiar with Favreau's previous work, nor had he ever seen a Star Wars film, but he was impressed with the screenplays and filmmaking style of The Mandalorian. Herzog strongly urged the show's filmmakers to use puppetry for the Child character and not computer-generated imagery, calling them "cowards" for considering using CGI in its place. The Client character and Herzog's performance have received generally positive reviews from critics.

Penn Pershing

Dr. Penn Pershing is a doctor and scientist affiliated with the Imperial remnant who works with the Client in his attempts to capture the Child. He has appeared in several episodes of The Mandalorian, starting with the series premiere "Chapter 1: The Mandalorian", in which he is present on an Imperial compound on Nevarro when the Client hires the Mandalorian to track down and deliver the Child. When the Client says he is willing to pay half-price for proof of termination, Pershing objects and says the child should be delivered alive. Pershing appears again in "Chapter 3: The Sin", when the Mandalorian delivers the Child to the Client. Later, when discussing the Child, the Client orders Pershing to "extract the necessary material and be done with it", but Pershing again protests, noting their employer has explicitly ordered them to bring the Child back alive. The Mandalorian later returns to the Imperial compound to rescue the child, killing all the stormtroopers there and finding Pershing with the Child, who is sedated and strapped into laboratory equipment. When the Mandalorian threatens Pershing, the scientist pleads for mercy and insists he protected the Child and prevented him from being killed. The Mandalorian takes the Child and leaves Pershing unharmed.

Dr. Pershing returns in season two. The Mandalorian witnesses a hologram recording of Pershing, who is providing an update to Moff Gideon on his experiments involving Grogu's blood. When the Dark Troopers apprehend Grogu, Gideon instructs his Comms officer to inform Dr. Pershing of Grogu's retrieval. In the season finale, Pershing is captured by the Mandalorian and his companions; he helps his captors infiltrate Gideon's ship to rescue Grogu.

Pershing is portrayed by Omid Abtahi, who previously voiced a Mandalorian character named Amis in the animated series Star Wars: The Clone Wars. Pershing's costume includes a patch on his right arm with an insignia similar to one worn by clones in the cloning facility on the planet Kamino in the prequel film Star Wars: Episode II – Attack of the Clones. This has led to speculation among some fans and writers that Pershing's plans for the Child involve cloning. Pershing also wears glasses, making him the first human live-action character in Disney's Star Wars canon to do so. This was contrary to a rule Star Wars creator George Lucas imposed, before selling the franchise to Disney, that no character wear glasses in the Star Wars universe. Pershing's costume, which also included a grey shirt with white shoulders and a high collar, was ranked eighth on a Screen Rant list of the ten best costumes in the first season of The Mandalorian. Inverse writer Allie Gemmill called Dr. Pershing an interesting character, particularly due to the mystery behind his possible association with Kamino.

Kuiil

Kuiil is an alien of the Ugnaught species, and a former indentured servant of the Galactic Empire. He is living in solitude on the planet Arvala-7 when he encounters the Mandalorian, who comes to the planet to find and capture the Child. Kuiil assists him, and then later helps him rebuild his ship when it is dismantled by Jawas. Kuiil also rebuilds the bounty hunter droid IG-11 after the Mandalorian destroys him. Kuiil and IG-11 later join the Mandalorian on a mission to protect the Child from the Imperial remnant on the planet Nevarro, where Kuiil is shot and killed by Imperial Scout Troopers while attempting to bring the Child to safety.

Kuiil is voiced by Nick Nolte, who completed his recordings for all the character's dialogue in a single afternoon. Kuiil's on-set performance was done by Misty Rosas, who during filming wore a face mask brought to life through animatronics and puppetry, with its electronics and wires concealed in the backpack and pockets of Kuiil's costume. Kuiil has been received positively by reviewers and fans alike. Several critics have called him the best character on the show, and his signature line "I have spoken" became one of the better-known and best-liked lines of dialogue from the series.

IG-11

IG-11 is a bounty hunter droid who initially attempts to capture and kill the Child, but is later reprogrammed to become its nurse and protector. The Mandalorian first encounters IG-11 when both attempt to collect the bounty on the Child. They work together to extract the Child from a gang of mercenaries, but when IG-11 tries to kill the Child, the Mandalorian instead shoots and kills the droid. IG-11's remains are recovered by Kuiil, who repairs and reprograms him. The droid later joins the Mandalorian on a mission to Nevarro to protect the Child from the Imperial remnant, and though the Mandalorian does not initially trust him, IG-11 ultimately sacrifices his own life to protect the Child and his allies.

IG-11 is voiced by Taika Waititi, who was offered the part by Jon Favreau based on their work together on Marvel films. Waititi said he tried to create a voice that lacked human emotion while still maintaining some semblance of humanity, describing it as a cross between Siri and HAL 9000. IG-11 was mistaken for the Star Wars bounty hunter IG-88 when first unveiled due to the resemblance between the two characters. IG-11 has been received positively by reviewers and fans alike, with some calling him one of the best droids in the franchise.

The Armorer

The Armorer is the leader of a tribe of Mandalorian warriors on Nevarro, which includes the show's title character. She provides spiritual guidance for the clan, and forges and repairs their armor, including a new set of armor she makes for the Mandalorian. In the first season finale "Chapter 8: Redemption", the Armorer instructs the Mandalorian to watch over and protect the Child, and to reunite the Child with others of his own kind. The character was partially inspired by the films of Akira Kurosawa, as well as the history and culture of the samurai, particularly in the character's deliberately-paced movement and aura of authority.

The Armorer is portrayed by Emily Swallow, who provides both the character's voice and live-action performance, while her stunts are performed by Lauren Mary Kim. When Swallow auditioned for the role, she knew little about the character and did not know it was for a Star Wars series. Aspects of The Mandalorian director Deborah Chow's personality influenced Swallow's portrayal of the character. Kim's combat style in the Armorer's fight scenes was inspired by the Filipino martial art known as Kali. The Armorer has been received positively by fans and reviewers alike, and has been described as a fan favorite.

Cara Dune

Cara Dune is a former Rebel shock trooper from Alderaan who became a mercenary after the fall of the Empire. Originally from Alderaan,  Cara is a highly trained warrior and skilled battle tactician. She harbors an intense hatred for the Galactic Empire, and is having trouble readjusting to post-war life. Cara first encounters the Mandalorian on the planet Sorgan, where they work together to protect a local village from raiders. He later recruits her to help protect the Child from the Imperial remnant.

Cara is portrayed by former mixed martial artist Gina Carano, for whom Favreau specifically created the character, without auditioning any other actresses. Favreau sought to create a powerful and independent character, but one different from Princess Leia or other strong Star Wars female characters. Carano performed many of her own stunts, and she credits Bryce Dallas Howard, who directed the character's first appearance in "Chapter 4: Sanctuary", with helping translate the character from the script to the screen. Cara has been received positively by reviewers and fans, and has been described as a feminist role model. Some critics called her unique even among the Star Wars franchise's female characters due to her physicality and combat skills.

Peli Motto

Peli Motto is a mechanic who manages a spaceport on Tatooine and is featured in "Chapter 5: The Gunslinger", "Chapter 9: The Marshal" and "Chapter 10: The Passenger". The Mandalorian hires her to repair his ship, and she also comes to take care of the Child. The bounty hunter Toro Calican briefly takes Peli and the Child as hostages in an unsuccessful attempt to abduct the Mandalorian. When the Mandalorian returns to Tatooine in search of another rumored to be there, Peli guides him to Mos Pelgo, where he finds Cobb Vanth with Boba Fett's armor. She later gives him the task of taking the Frog Lady to Trask, where her husband knows other Mandalorians' whereabouts.

Peli is portrayed by actress and comedian Amy Sedaris, who had previously worked with The Mandalorian creator Jon Favreau on the film Elf (2003). Sedaris said she enjoyed working with the animatronic Child puppet, which she said made everyone on the set happy: "The minute you looked into Baby Yoda's eyes you just got lost." The character and Sedaris' performance drew acclaim from fans and reviewers, so much so that Sedaris became a trending topic on Twitter after the episode first became available.

Peli appears in the fifth episode of The Book of Boba Fett, "Chapter 5: Return of the Mandalorian". Peli has kept her shop open and gains additional help from Jawas who bring her pieces of scrap. She helps customize an anabolic Starfighter for Din Djarin, which he later uses. The also reveals that Peli dated a Jawa at some point before the events of The Mandalorian. She also refers to the Jawa she dated as "furry".

Fennec Shand

Fennec Shand is an assassin and mercenary for the galaxy's top crime syndicates, who is sought by Toro Calican for his first bounty hunting assignment. Calican catches Fennec with assistance from the Mandalorian. When Fennec tries to convince Toro to free her so they could capture the Mandalorian and deliver him to the Bounty Hunters' Guild, Toro instead kills Fennec and seeks to capture the Mandalorian himself. Her body is later approached by an unidentified character.

It is later revealed that this character was Boba Fett, who patched her up with some cybernetics. In "Chapter 14: The Tragedy", Fennec accompanied Boba Fett to Tython in order to reclaim his armor from the Mandalorian's ship. During a standoff with the Mandalorian, the three of them come under attack by the Stormtroopers dispatched by Moff Gideon. Fennec managed to decimate some Stormtroopers which also involved sending a boulder into their machine gun. When the Dark Troopers make off with Grogu and the Razor Crest is destroyed, Fennec and Boba Fett declare themselves in the Mandalorian's debt and agree to help him rescue Grogu.

Portrayed by actress Ming-Na Wen, Fennec Shand is the first major Star Wars villain character portrayed by an Asian actress. Elements of the character's personality were inspired by characteristics of the fennec fox, including its trickiness, stealthiness, maneuverability, and ability to survive. The fox also influenced the design of Fennec's costume and hairstyle. Costume designer Joseph Porro incorporated orange accents into Fennec's black costume, and Wen recommended the character's hair include braids inspired by the fennec fox. Fennec Shand has been received positively by reviewers and fans alike, and has been described as a fan favorite. Several reviewers felt the character was eliminated too quickly and did not get the chance to live up to her potential, and some critics have speculated that the character could still be alive.

This is confirmed in the second-season episode "Chapter 14: The Tragedy" that Fennec Shand is alive, discovered and saved by Boba Fett before her injuries proved fatal.

Moff Gideon

Moff Gideon is the leader of the Imperial remnant and the primary antagonist of The Mandalorian. Few details of his backstory have yet been revealed. He was previously an operative in the Imperial Security Bureau, a covert intelligence arm and secret police for the Empire, and played a role in past efforts to eliminate the Mandalorians. In The Mandalorian, Moff Gideon is attempting to abduct the Child to extract its blood for experimentation. In the first season, Gideon briefly traps the Mandalorian and his allies on Nevarro in an unsuccessful attempt to obtain the Child. Gideon reveals he knows secret details about the Mandalorian and his allies, and is the first character in the series to reveal the Mandalorian's real name, Din Djarin. In the final scene of the first season finale "Chapter 8: Redemption", it is revealed that Gideon possesses the Darksaber, a Mandalorian lightsaber.

Gideon returns in the second season as he continues to track down Grogu. "Chapter 12: The Siege" reveals that Gideon requires access to Grogu's blood, which contains a high 'M-count', for it to be transfused into a test subject. However, the experiments have thus far resulted in "catastrophic failure". Later in the season, Gideon apprehends Grogu and seeks to continue the experimentation, but the Mandalorian captures Dr. Pershing and infiltrates Gideon's ship. Gideon battles the Mandalorian with the Darksaber, but is ultimately defeated. As a platoon of Dark Troopers attempt to rescue him, Luke Skywalker arrives and destroys the droids. Gideon attempts suicide, but is incapacitated by Cara Dune. Grogu is taken by Skywalker to be trained as a Jedi.

Gideon is portrayed by Giancarlo Esposito. He was recruited for the part by Jon Favreau, who had previously worked with Esposito on several projects. Gideon has been received positively by reviewers and fans.

Introduced in season two

Boba Fett

Boba Fett is a Mandalorian bounty hunter who first appeared in The Empire Strikes Back. Having survived the Sarlacc Pit he fell into in Return of the Jedi, he makes his return in a silent cameo in "Chapter 9: The Marshal". He reappears in "Chapter 14: The Tragedy", where he is revealed to have saved Fennec Shand on Tatooine after the events of "Chapter 5: The Gunslinger". Initially demanding Din to return his armor which the latter had acquired from Cobb Vanth, he and Fennec later aid Din in battling Gideon's forces as he regains his armor in the process. When the Dark Troopers make off with Grogu and the Razor Crest is destroyed, Fett and Fennec swear to help the Mandalorian rescue Grogu as repayment to Din for returning his armor.

Fett is played by Temuera Morrison, who previously portrayed Boba's father Jango Fett (of whom Boba is a biological clone) in Star Wars: Episode II - Attack of the Clones and voiced Boba in the 2004 DVD releases of The Empire Strikes Back and Return of the Jedi.

Frog Lady
The "Frog Lady" is a female frog-like creature who appears in "Chapter 10: The Passenger" and "Chapter 11: The Heiress". She enlists the Mandalorian to take her and her eggs to the moon Trask to be reunited with her husband, who can fertilize the eggs, in exchange for information on other Mandalorians' whereabouts. She doesn't speak Galactic Basic, but briefly uses the damaged droid Q9-0's vocabulator to communicate with the Mandalorian. Because of the eggs' fragility, they have to travel at "sub-light", and end up crashing on an icy planet to avoid a X-wing fighter patrol who have an arrest warrant for the Mandalorian since he has helped break out Qin from the New Republic transport. They are nearly killed by a swarm of spider-like Krynka, but are rescued by the X-Wing pilots who let the Mandalorian go with a warning because he assisted in the capture of the others involved in the prison break. After completing repairs, they manage to continue their journey to Trask.

The Frog Lady reunites with her mate the Frog Man upon their arrival on Trask. The Mandalorian leaves the Child with the Frog Lady and the Frog Man to babysit. Following the mission with Bo-Katan, the Mandalorian returns where he finds the Child interacting with the hatchlings.

The Frog Lady is performed by Misty Rosas and her vocal effects are provided by Dee Bradley Baker.

The Frog Lady was positively received by fans.

Koska Reeves
Reeves is a Mandalorian warrior who appears in "Chapter 11: The Heiress" and "Chapter 16: The Rescue". Reeves is part of the Nite Owls and fights alongside Bo-Katan.

Reeves is portrayed by Mercedes Varnado, a professional wrestler better known by the ring names Sasha Banks and Mercedes Moné.

Featured guest characters
Several characters have been featured in a single episode within a season of The Mandalorian in which they play a significant role.

Introduced in season one

Mythrol
An unnamed Mythrol appears in the opening scenes of the series premiere "Chapter 1: The Mandalorian", in which the Mandalorian captures him to collect a bounty. He re-appears in "Chapter 12: The Siege". Blue-skinned and amphibious, with fins on his face, the Mythrol is ultimately delivered to the Bounty Hunters' Guild.

The Mythrol returned in the second season episode "Chapter 12: The Siege" where he was released from his Carbonite prison to work as a bookkeeper in exchange for a reduced sentence. He also mentioned that he's still suffering from the side effect of the Carbonite where he hasn't regained vision in his left eye yet. The Mythrol was brought along with the Mandalorian, Karga, and Cara Dune during their raid on an Imperial base where he does things when either threatened to be put back in Carbonite to have his sentence cut in half. He was the one who found the message from Dr. Pershing to Moff Gideon about the experiments involving the Child's DNA.

The Mythrol is portrayed by comedian Horatio Sanz, a long-time fan of Star Wars.

Toro Calican
Toro Calican is a young bounty hunter who encountered the Mandalorian in episode "Chapter 5: The Gunslinger". He recruits the Mandalorian's help capturing the assassin Fennec Shand. It is Toro's first bounty hunting assignment, and he hopes it will help him get into the Bounty Hunters' Guild. Toro later double-crosses the Mandalorian and attempts to turn him over to the Guild, but is instead shot and killed by the Mandalorian.

Toro Calican is portrayed by Jake Cannavale. The character received mixed reviews from critics.

Ranzar Malk
Ranzar "Ran" Malk is the leader of a group of mercenaries that operate out of a space station in "Chapter 6: The Prisoner". He develops a plan for his crew to infiltrate a New Republic prison ship and rescue Qin, an imprisoned Twi'lek. After the mission, Ran tries to have the Mandalorian killed, but instead his space station is attacked by New Republic X-wing fighters, which were led there by the Mandalorian.

Ran is portrayed by Mark Boone Junior. Fans reacted positively to Ran's character and Boone's performance, and the character was included on Vultures list of the show's 15 best cameo appearances from season one.

Migs Mayfeld

Migs Mayfeld is a former Imperial Army sharpshooter who leads a crew of Ranzar "Ran" Malk's mercenaries in their attempt to rescue Qin from a New Republic prison transport ship. He uses two blaster pistols, as well as a third blaster controlled by a droid arm attached to his backpack. Mayfeld clashes repeatedly with the Mandalorian during the mission, and ultimately attempts to betray him, but instead the Mandalorian incapacitates Mayfeld and locks him in a cell on the transport.

After Dark Troopers make off with Grogu, the Mandalorian later asks Cara Dune about where Mayfeld is being held. She finds information stating that Mayfeld was sentenced to 50 years on the Karthon Chop Fields. Dune has him put on work release so that they can get to an Imperial console on Morak. Mayfeld and a disguised Mandalorian make it to the Imperial Rhydonium refinery after fighting off some pirates. The terminal Mayfeld needs is in the officer's mess hall, but Mayfeld sees his former commanding officer Valin Hess and fears being recognized. The Mandalorian goes instead but the terminal requires a facial scan, and he removes his helmet to acquire the codes. He is confronted by Hess, but Mayfeld intervenes. After a tense drink where Hess insults dead soldiers from Operation: Cinder on Burnin Konn, an angered Mayfeld shoots Hess dead. The Mandalorian and Mayfeld fight their way past the Stormtroopers and Shoretroopers until Boba Fett extracts them. Then Mayfeld blows up the refinery. After getting what they need, Dune and the Mandalorian allow Mayfeld to leave while covering this up by stating that he was killed in action.

Mayfeld is portrayed by actor and comedian Bill Burr, who was not a fan of Star Wars and repeatedly mocked the franchise and its fans before he accepted the role. Jon Favreau offered the part to Burr, believing his past criticism of the franchise would make his casting that much more amusing. Burr was extremely impressed with the filming of The Mandalorian, complimenting the technical aspects of filming as well as the writing style of the series. The character of Mayfeld received a generally positive response from reviewers, and several critics noted that Mayfeld's sardonic personality and hard-edged sense of humor are similar to Burr's real-life comedic style.

Xi'an
Xi'an is a female purple-skinned Twi'lek who appears in "Chapter 6: The Prisoner". A former love interest of the Mandalorian, she is part of the rescue team sent by Ranzar "Ran" Malk to rescue her brother Qin from a New Republic prison transport. She attempts to betray the Mandalorian during the mission, but instead he incapacitates Xi'an and locks her in a cell on the prison transport.

Xi'an is portrayed by Natalia Tena, the only actress who has appeared in Star Wars, Game of Thrones, and the Harry Potter film series. She is also the second Game of Thrones star to also appear in The Mandalorian, along with Pedro Pascal. Xi'an has received mixed reviews from critics, and several reviewers compared her to the comic book character Harley Quinn.

Burg
Burg, a red-skinned Devaronian, is the "muscle" of Ranzar "Ran" Malk's mercenary party sent to rescue Qin from a New Republic prison transport ship in "Chapter 6: The Prisoner". Extremely strong, he repeatedly mocks the Mandalorian during their time together, at one point attempting to forcibly remove his helmet. Burg attempts to betray the Mandalorian during the mission, but the Mandalorian defeats him in a fight, and locks him into a cell on the prison transport.

Burg is portrayed by Clancy Brown, who also voiced the Mandalorian bounty hunter Montross in Star Wars: Bounty Hunter (2002), Savage Opress in Star Wars: The Clone Wars, and Ryder Azadi in Star Wars Rebels. Burg was well received by reviewers, with several comparing him to the fictional superhero Hellboy.

Q9-0
Q9-0, also referred to simply as Zero, is a droid who acts as the pilot, navigator, and hacker for the mercenary crew sent by Ranzar "Ran" Malk to rescue Qin from a New Republic prison transport ship in "Chapter 6: The Prisoner". During the mission, Q9-0 discovers there is a high bounty on the Child, whom he attempts to kill, but the Mandalorian shoots and destroys Q9-0 before he can do so.

In "Chapter 10: The Passenger", it is revealed that the Mandalorian has kept Q9-0's remains on the Razor Crest. At one point, the Frog Lady uses the droid's vocabulator to better communicate with the Mandalorian so that he can understand what she is saying.

Q9-0 is voiced by Richard Ayoade. The character received generally positive reviews from critics. A Funko Pop figurine of Q9-0 has been released.

Qin
Qin is a male purple-skinned Twi'lek who was being held captive on a New Republic prison transport ship in "Chapter 6: The Prisoner". Qin blamed the Mandalorian for his imprisonment. Ranzar "Ran" Malk arranges for a mercenary party to rescue Qin, which includes the Mandalorian. After the team infiltrates the ship and recovers Qin, they lock the Mandalorian in Qin's cell and attempt to abandon him there, but he escapes. The Mandalorian returns Qin to Ran's space station, but also leads the New Republic to their location, and the station is attacked by X-wing fighters while Qin is aboard.

Qin is portrayed by Ismael Cruz Córdova. The character received mixed reviews from critics.

Introduced in season two

Gor Koresh
Gor Koresh is an Abyssin gangster whom the Mandalorian sought out for information on any Mandalorian sightings in "Chapter 9: The Marshal". When the Mandalorian approaches him while he is watching a ring fight, Koresh orders his henchmen to kill him and steal his beskar armor, but the Mandalorian defeats them and interrogates Koresh, who informs them of a Mandalorian warrior operating on Tatooine. The Mandalorian then leaves Koresh hanging from the lamppost where he shoots the lights out as nocturnal creatures start to close in.

Gor Koresh is performed by John Rosengrant and voiced by John Leguizamo.

Cobb Vanth

Cobb Vanth is the marshal of the Tatooine town of Mos Pelgo. On the day when the second Death Star was destroyed, Cobb was present when the Mining Collective attacked Mos Pelgo. Although he was forced to work as a slave, he eventually escaped with a box that, unbeknownst to him, contained crystals, which he traded to his Jawa rescuers in exchange for the salvaged Mandalorian armor formerly owned by Boba Fett. Using the armor, Cobb drove off the invaders, and continued to protect the townspeople of Mos Pelgo ever since.

In "Chapter 9: The Marshal", the Mandalorian is told to seek out Cobb by people who had mistaken him for an actual Mandalorian because of his armor. When the Mandalorian meets Cobb and finds out the truth, he demands that Cobb remove his armor. Their stand-off is interrupted by the attack of a Krayt dragon that has been terrorizing Mos Pelgo, and Cobb persuades the Mandalorian to assist him in killing it in exchange for the armor. Together, they form an unlikely alliance between the townspeople and the Tusken Raiders to eliminate their common enemy, before the Mandalorian comes up with a strategy to use a Bantha as a suicide bomber and have it detonate once the dragon eats it. When the plan fails, the Mandalorian decides to allow himself to be eaten as well in order to manually detonate the explosives, and entrusts Cobb to look after the Child, should he perish. The Mandalorian survives and, with the dragon slain, he parts ways amicably with Cobb, who hands him his armor.

Cobb Vanth is portrayed by Timothy Olyphant. The character was introduced in the Star Wars: Aftermath trilogy of novels written by Chuck Wendig.

Axe Woves
Axe Woves is a Mandalorian warrior who appears in "Chapter 11: The Heiress".

Axe is portrayed by Simon Kassianides. The character was named by George Lucas who visited the set during the shooting of Chapter 11.

Imperial Captain
The unnamed Imperial Captain appears in "Chapter 11: The Heiress" as the captain of an Imperial cargo ship that contained stolen Mandalorian weapons. The Mandalorian helped Bo-Katan Kryze's group in reclaiming it. The captain informed Moff Gideon about the situation and called for backup only to be told by Gideon to sacrifice the ship as they are beyond rescue right now. After Bo-Katan's group makes their way into the bridge and stops the ship from crashing, Bo-Katan demands the Captain to tell her the location of the Darksaber, but he fears Gideon more than her and commits suicide by biting on an electric capsule.

The unnamed Imperial Captain is portrayed by Titus Welliver.

Elia Kane

Elia Kane is a former Imperial communications officer who served under Gideon. In season 3, she joins the New Republic and serves in an amnesty housing program.

Kane is portrayed by Katy M. O'Brian.

Lang
Lang is an Imperial Lieutenant who works for Morgan Elsbeth on the planet Corvus. He assisted her in oppressing the citizens of Calodan while leading the fight against Ahsoka Tano. When the Mandalorian arrived in Calodan, Lang took him to Morgan. Lang later led his troops into fighting Ahsoka and the Mandalorian when they attacked Calodan and took down the soldiers loyal to Morgan. As Ahsoka dueled with Morgan, Lang was in a stand-off with the Mandalorian. When Morgan was defeated, Lang put down his weapons and tried to fake surrender by pulling out a smaller blaster only to be shot by the Mandalorian.

Lang is portrayed by Michael Biehn.

Ahsoka Tano

Ahsoka Tano is a Togruta, former Jedi Padawan to Anakin Skywalker, and whom the Mandalorian seeks out in order to return the Child to his species. When on Corvus, she attacked Calodan in order for Morgan Elsbeth to divulge to her the location of her master. The Mandalorian met Ahsoka Tano, and she was able to interact with The Child without words as they can feel each other's thoughts. Ahsoka then reveals that Grogu is the Child’s name. She mentions that Grogu is only the second living being of his species that Ahsoka has encountered, the first being Master Yoda. After testing one of Grogu's abilities, Ahsoka didn't want to train him due to the bad path he might take. The Mandalorian and Ahsoka work together to liberate Calodan from Elsbeth who is defeated by Ahsoka. She gives the unseen answer to Ahsoka on where her master Grand Admiral Thrawn is. Before the Mandalorian and Grogu take their leave, Ahsoka directs them to Tython where there are the ruins of an old temple. If his calls are answered by another Jedi, he will be trained by that Jedi.

Ahsoka is portrayed by Rosario Dawson in "Chapter 13: The Jedi". The character was previously voiced by Ashley Eckstein in Star Wars: The Clone Wars, Star Wars Rebels, and Star Wars: The Rise of Skywalker.

Morgan Elsbeth
Morgan Elsbeth is the Imperial Magistrate of Calodan on the planet Corvus.

In her early life, her people were attacked during the Clone Wars. During the rise of the Galactic Empire, Morgan helped to build the Imperial Fleet and has worked for Grand Admiral Thrawn, and she pillaged different worlds.

She ruled Calodan with an iron fist and strung up her prisoners in electrical cages. Ahsoka Tano did different attacks on Calodan in order to get Morgan to divulge the location of Thrawn. When the Mandalorian arrived on Corvus, Morgan contracted him to find Ahsoka, for which she will give him a pure beskar staff as reward. The Mandalorian and Ahsoka worked together to liberate Calodan from Morgan's rule. Following Morgan's overthrow, a man named Wing became the governor of Calodan.

Morgan Elsbeth is portrayed by Diana Lee Inosanto.

Luke Skywalker

Luke Skywalker is the Jedi Master who responds to Grogu's transmission through the Force, rescuing him from Gideon's Dark Troopers in "Chapter 16: The Rescue". Alongside R2-D2, he subsequently agrees to train Grogu as a Jedi Padawan.

Luke is portrayed by Mark Hamill, who was digitally de-aged to portray a younger Luke Skywalker. Max Lloyd-Jones served as an on-set body double for the character.

Minor guest characters
Several characters have appeared on The Mandalorian in minor roles or significant cameo appearances.

Introduced in season one

Paz Vizsla

Paz Vizsla is one of the warriors in the Mandalorian tribe on Nevarro. Strong and physically imposing, he is a heavy infantry fighter. He appears in the episode "Chapter 3: The Sin", where he initially quarrels with the Mandalorian for working with the Empire, but later comes to his assistance when the Mandalorian is being attacked.

Paz Vizsla is voiced by Jon Favreau, who previously voiced a similarly-named Mandalorian warlord named Pre Vizsla on the series Star Wars: The Clone Wars. Stunt performer and former mixed martial artist Tait Fletcher was the live-action body double for Paz Vizsla.

Omera
Omera is a krill farmer and widow living on a village on Sorgan with her daughter, Winta, in the episode "Chapter 4: Sanctuary". When the villagers hire the Mandalorian and Cara Dune to protect them from Klatooinian raiders, Omera befriends the Mandalorian, and the two appear attracted to each other. She participates in the village's successful defense of the village and elimination of the raiders.

Omera is portrayed by Julia Jones. "Chapter 4" director Bryce Dallas Howard said it was challenging directing emotional scenes between Omera and the Mandalorian because he always wears a helmet, but that the scenes worked because "Julia is deeply connected to her emotions and you can just feel them on her face." Brendan Wayne, a body double for the Mandalorian character, said his scenes with Jones were so emotional that they made him cry. The character of Omera has received mixed reviews from critics.

Winta
Winta is the young daughter of Omera, living in a village on Sorgan in "Chapter 4: Sanctuary". She develops a close friendship with the Child after the Mandalorian brings him to the village.

Winta is portrayed by Isla Farris.

Caben and Stoke
Caben and Stoke are krill farmers in a Sorgan village in "Chapter 4: Sanctuary". The two hire the Mandalorian to provide protection from Klatooinian raiders attacking the village.

Caben is portrayed by actor and comedian Asif Ali, and Stoke is played by actor and comedian Eugene Cordero. The two were included on Vultures list of the show's 15 best cameo appearances from season one, in which writer Jackson McHenry described them as "a delightful pair of goofy villagers".

Riot Mar
Riot Mar is a bounty hunter who attempts to recover the Child from the Mandalorian in "Chapter 5: The Gunslinger". Riot pilots a starfighter and attacks the Mandalorian's ship, but is killed by the Mandalorian after a brief dogfight.

Riot Mar is portrayed by Rio Hackford.

Davan
Davan is a soldier with the New Republic and the sole non-droid crew member of a New Republic prison transport ship in "Chapter 6: The Prisoner". Despite efforts by the Mandalorian to save him, Davan is murdered by a gang of mercenaries who board the ship to rescue the prisoner Qin.

Davan is portrayed by Matt Lanter, who also provides the voice of Star Wars protagonist Anakin Skywalker in Star Wars: The Clone Wars, as well as other minor characters. Syfy Wire writer Bryan Young noted that Lanter's performance as Davan sounds nothing like his voice for Anakin, which Young said "speaks to his skill as an actor".

Trapper Wolf, Jib Dodger and Sash Ketter
Trapper Wolf, Jib Dodger and Sash Ketter are a trio of New Republic X-wing starfighter pilots, who investigate a homing beacon activated from a New Republic prison transport ship in "Chapter 6: The Prisoner". The pilots follow the beacon to a space station operated by mercenary Ranzar "Ran" Malk, which they attack.

In "Chapter 10: The Passenger," Trapper Wolf accompanied Carson Teva in investigating the Razor Crest.

Each of the three pilots are played by directors of first season episodes making cameo appearances: Jib is portrayed by Rick Famuyiwa, Sash is played by Deborah Chow, and Trapper is portrayed by Dave Filoni. Famuyiwa directed and co-wrote the episode in which he appeared. Trapper Wolf's name was inspired by Filoni's love of wolves.

Introduced in season two

Carson Teva
Carson Teva is a captain in the New Republic's Starfighter Corps who originated from Alderaan. He first appeared in "Chapter 10: The Passenger" where he and Trapper Wolf follow the Razor Crest wanting a ping from it upon entering an area of space that is under the New Republic's jurisdiction and wanting to ask about the New Republic Correctional Transport incident which led to the Mandalorian flying to Maldo Kreis. Teva and Wolf catch up to the Mandalorian where they slew some ice spiders. After noting that he was sighted with some criminals during a breakout and that he left the same criminals in a cell, they were able to overlook it. Before leaving, Carson advises that the Mandalorian gets his transponder fixed by the next time they run into each other.

In "Chapter 12: The Siege", Carson Teva and one of his fellow New Republic Starfighter Corps members visited Nevarro where he asked Greef Karga about the destruction of an Imperial base there. After Karga confirmed some information, Teva later spoke to Cara Dune where he states that the New Republic is not sure what is happening in the Outer Rim and they won't be able to get to the bottom of it without local support. It is also revealed that they suffered mutual losses of people they knew the day when Alderaan was destroyed.

Carson Teva is portrayed by Paul Sun-Hyung Lee.

Governor Wing
Governor Wing is a human who lives in Calodan on the planet Corvus at the time when its people were oppressed by Magistrate Morgan Elsbeth. While the Mandalorian and Ahsoka Tano were fighting Morgan's forces, Wing helped to free the prisoners. When Morgan is defeated by Ahsoka and overthrown, Wing becomes the governor of Calodan.

Governor Wing is portrayed by Wing Tao Chao, a Disney executive who retired in 2009.

Valin Hess
Valin Hess is an Imperial officer who used to have Migs Mayfeld as a soldier and participated in Operation: Cinder. A disguised Mandalorian and Mayfeld encounter him at a Rhydonium refinery on Morak. The terminal Mayfeld needs is in the officer's mess hall, but Mayfeld sees his former commanding officer Valin Hess and fears being recognized. The Mandalorian goes instead, but the terminal requires a facial scan and he removes his helmet to acquire the codes. He is confronted by Hess, but Mayfeld intervenes. After a tense drink where Hess insults dead soldiers from Operation: Cinder, an angered Mayfeld shoots Hess dead.

Valin Hess is portrayed by Richard Brake.

R2-D2

R2-D2 is a droid that was befriended by Luke Skywalker. He appeared with Luke in "Chapter 16: The Rescue" where they obtain Grogu so that Luke can train him.

Bib Fortuna

Bib Fortuna is the former aide of Jabba the Hutt. He appears in the post-credits scene of "Chapter 16: The Rescue" where he is revealed to have taken over Jabba's palace, and is subsequently killed by his former ally Boba Fett.

Bib Fortuna is portrayed by Matthew Wood; he previously appeared as the character in Star Wars: The Phantom Menace.

Introduced in season three

Ragnar
Ragnar is a Mandalorian intiate who was in the midst of being sworn in by the Armorer as part of a coming of age ritual. It was disrupted when a Dinosaur Turtle emerged from the lake as the Armorer gets Ragnar out of the way.

Ragnar is portrayed by Wesley Kimmel.

Gorian Shard
Gorian Shard is the captain of a group of pirates who operated in the sector where Nevarro is.

Gorian Shard is performed by Carey Jones and voiced by Nonso Anozie.

Vane
Vane is a member of Gorian Shard's pirate crew.

Vane is portrayed by Marti Matulis.

R5-D4
R5-D4 is a malfunctioning astromech that was supposed to be sold to Owen Lars back in Star Wars. Years later, he appears in Pelli Moto's custody after getting him from the Jawas. Due to Moto not having a part associated with IG-11, she lent R5-D4 to the Mandalorian in order to explore the surface of Mandalore and to see if its atmosphere is toxic.

See also
 List of The Book of Boba Fett characters
 List of Star Wars characters
 Mandalorian

Notes

References

External links
 

 
Star Wars character lists
Star Wars television characters
Lists of Disney characters
Lists of science fiction television characters